The following lists events that happened during 2008 in Rwanda.

Incumbents 
 President: Paul Kagame 
 Prime Minister: Bernard Makuza

Events

August
 August 5 - Rwanda formally accuses senior French officials, including former Prime Minister Dominique de Villepin and late President François Mitterrand, of involvement in the 1994 Rwandan genocide and calls for them to be put on trial.

September
 September 17 - Rwanda becomes the first nation where women outnumber men in parliament.

October
 October 9 - The Democratic Republic of the Congo accuses Rwanda of sending troops across the border, threatening the city of Goma.

December
 December 18 - The International Criminal Tribunal for Rwanda finds Théoneste Bagosora guilty of genocide, crimes against humanity and war crimes and sentences him to life imprisonment.

References

 
2000s in Rwanda
Years of the 21st century in Rwanda
Rwanda
Rwanda